Donald Parker Stockton (22 February 1904 – 16 June 1978) was a Canadian Olympic medalist in freestyle wrestling. He won an Olympic silver medalist at the 1928 Summer Olympics, and also competed at the 1924 and 1932 Summer Olympics.

Early life
Donald Stockton was born on February 22, 1904.

Career
Stockton began his Olympic career at the 1924 Summer Olympics in the freestyle welterweight division. At the 1928 Summer Olympics, he became the first Canadian to be awarded an Olympic silver medal in wrestling. Stockton final Olympic games were at the 1932 Summer Olympics. After his Olympic career, Stockton became a professional wrestler in 1933 and wrestled at the Mount Royal Arena.

Awards and honours
In 1953, Stockton entered the Canadian Olympic Hall of Fame and was inducted into the Canadian Amateur Wrestling Hall of Fame in 1975. Stockton was posthumously inducted into the Quebec Sports Hall of Fame in 2016.

Death
Stockton died in Montreal on June 16, 1978.

References

External links

1904 births
1978 deaths
Sportspeople from Montreal
Olympic wrestlers of Canada
Wrestlers at the 1924 Summer Olympics
Wrestlers at the 1928 Summer Olympics
Wrestlers at the 1932 Summer Olympics
Canadian male sport wrestlers
Olympic silver medalists for Canada
Olympic medalists in wrestling
Medalists at the 1928 Summer Olympics
Anglophone Quebec people
Canadian male professional wrestlers
20th-century Canadian people